Rhodocyclus gelatinosus is a gram-negative bacterium which has been transferred to Rubrivivax gelatinosus.

References

Rhodocyclaceae
Bacteria described in 1984